"Them" is the third studio album by Danish heavy metal band King Diamond, released in 1988 via Roadrunner Records. It is the first album to feature guitarist Pete Blakk and bassist Hal Patino.

"Them" is the first of two fictional concept albums about King and his mentally ill grandmother, the second of these being Conspiracy. King falls into a harrowing descent into madness via his grandmother and the voices in the House of Amon, known to the listener only as "Them".

Plot summary
As the album opens, a young King and his mother and sister are welcoming King's grandmother home from a mental asylum.  That night, King investigates strange voices and discovers his grandmother having a tea party seemingly alone, though with the teacups and kettles floating in the air.  King is invited into the room, to sit in his grandmother's chair.  King is sent back to bed, but only after staring into his grandmother's eyes, whereupon she instructed him to forget what he saw.

One day, Grandma awakens King and tells him that she will teach him about the house of “Amon”, over a cup of tea. “Amon” being the tea pot, “Their” item of power and importance that seemed to require a blood sacrifice. Through the blood they commutate or take control of those who drink it. Grandma cuts King's sleeping mother's hand and adds her blood to the teapot. After drinking the “tea” the voices haunting the house ("Them") begin to affect King with a drug-like effect.  King's sister Missy tries to convince King that they should do something to help their mother, who is unconscious and weak due to "their" control and possible blood loss, but his judgment is clouded due to his altered state.  He refuses to call for help and cuts the phone line.  At tea, Missy interrupts and furiously expresses concern about her mother's state, Missy being deemed a problem is attacked by Grandma and in spiteful retaliation, Missy breaks "Amon" the teapot. "They", in furious response to the breaking of "their" beloved teapot "Amon", chop Missy into bits with an axe and throw the remains into the fireplace in the kitchen. "Their" focus no longer on King, he snapped out of his "spell," and he stumbles outside and pieces together the events that transpired. 

After fainting and regaining consciousness, he decides to attack his grandmother. He notices that "their" power is weakened outside the house, so he lures his grandmother outside and kills her.  The voices of Amon continue to haunt the boy as he is questioned by police and incarcerated in an asylum.  Years later, he is released and returns home to find his grandmother and the voices of Amon are still very much alive.

In other media
The song "Welcome Home" and lyrics from the song "Invisible Guests" were featured in the film Clerks II. "Welcome Home" was also featured in the 2009 video game Brütal Legend.

Track listing

Personnel
King Diamond – vocals, keyboards, guitar on rehearsal versions, producer, mixing
Andy LaRocque – guitar, acoustic guitar on "Them", assistant producer
Pete Blakk – guitar
Hal Patino – bass
Mikkey Dee – drums, assistant producer
Roberto Falcao – keyboards, producer, engineer, mixing
Timi Hansen – bass on rehearsal versions

External links
Official website

References

King Diamond albums
1988 albums
Concept albums
Roadrunner Records albums
Rock operas